Where Are You Going on Holiday, also known as Dove vai in vacanza?, is a 1978 Italian anthology comedy film directed by Mauro Bolognini, Luciano Salce and Alberto Sordi.

Plot 
The film is divided into three episodes.

Sarò tutta per te 
Enrico intends to recover the loving relationship with his ex-girlfriend Giuliana. She agrees and the two go in the house of her, but all of a sudden Enrico realizes he is not alone. In fact the young friends of Giuliana have reached the villa in the evening and plan many evening parties: typical of the flower children of that period. Enrico, on the threshold of fifty, feels him excluded and displaced, completely alien to the new juvenile behavior and his only instinct is to make love with Giuliana. When she agrees exasperated the poor Enrico blatantly fails to satisfy her in an embrace and so their relationship breaks down again.

Sì buana 
Arturo finds employment as an improvised tour guide for a cheap travel agency, where he works under the assumed name "Wilson" to hide his Italian roots. During an organized safari, he is approached by one of the clients, a wealthy businessman named Colombi, who bribes Wilson to illegally procure a lion for him to hunt. Though initially reluctant, Wilson is eventually persuaded by Colombi's trophy wife, who also tries to convince him to shoot her husband under the appearance of a hunting accident, in exchange for a share of her insurance money. Wilson's plan is to take Colombi to a lion who died of its own, making him believe he killed it himself; however, the carcass attracts a living lion, which attacks the group. In the commotion, Colombi is fatally shot by his wife.

The episode is delivered in a flashback as a drunken Wilson tells the whole story to a well-mannered gentleman, who turns out to be the insurance agent investigating Colombi's death. Having inadvertently confessed to the whole ruse, Wilson loses the promised insurance share as well as Colombi's bribe.

Le vacanze intelligenti 
The simpletons greengrocers Remo and Augusta are convinced by their three sons to embark on a tour that includes visits to Italy in museums, churches, theaters and places of modern art. The two don't want this, but they're so proud of the professional skills of their children who decide to deal with this sacrifice. So Augusta and Remo set out on an Etruscan necropolis and then to many other destinations to Venice Biennale, not understanding anything about modern art or futurists concerts. Remo and Augusta however are increasingly convinced that the children have decided this trip for their own good, and so they continue until the two get fed up and decide to go back to their old life. Back home, they discover that the furniture is completely changed and has become exactly like that of the modern houses of the hippies of the Seventies. The two simpletons, while regretting the past dear, also accept this deprivation.

Cast 
Sarò tutta per te
(segment directed by Mauro Bolognini)
 Ugo Tognazzi: Enrico
 Stefania Sandrelli: Giuliana
 Pietro Brambilla: Tommaso
 Clara Colosimo: Virginia 
 Lorraine De Selle: ragazza al telefono 
 Ricky Tognazzi: amico di Giuliana
 Rodolfo Bigotti: Fulvio
 Elisabetta Pozzi: amica di Giuliana

Sì buana 
(segment directed by Luciano Salce)
 Paolo Villaggio: Arturo alias "Wilson"
 Gigi Reder: Dott. Panunti
 Anna Maria Rizzoli: Margherita 
 Daniele Vargas: Cav. Ciccio Colombi
 Paolo Paoloni: agent Lloyd

Le vacanze intelligenti 
(segment directed by Alberto Sordi)
 Alberto Sordi: Remo Proietti
 Anna Longhi: his wife Augusta
 Evelina Nazzari: Pasquina
 Stefania Spugnini: Romolina

References

External links

1978 films
Italian comedy films
1978 comedy films
1970s Italian-language films
Films directed by Mauro Bolognini
Films directed by Luciano Salce
Films directed by Alberto Sordi
Commedia all'italiana
Films about vacationing
Films with screenplays by Age & Scarpelli
Films scored by Ennio Morricone
Films scored by Piero Piccioni
Films with screenplays by Ruggero Maccari
1970s Italian films